The Saskatchewan Volunteer Medal (SVM) is a civil decoration for volunteers in the Canadian province of Saskatchewan, introduced in 1995 by the Government of Saskatchewan.  Prior to the establishment of the medal volunteerism could be recognized by the Saskatchewan Order of Merit, but this is only one of the fields for which the Order is presented.  The medal was established to remedy inadequate recognition of volunteerism by the provincial government.

Description
The medal is circular, made of silver, suspended from a V-shaped clasp.  The obverse depicts the shield of the Coat of arms of Saskatchewan surmounted by St Edward's Crown.  Inscribed above the shield is the motto "Nos ipsos dedimus" (We Gave of Ourselves), and below is "Saskatchewan".

See also
 Saskatchewan Order of Merit
 Sovereign's Medal for Volunteers
 Ontario Medal for Good Citizenship
 British Columbia Medal of Good Citizenship

References

External links
 Recipients of the Saskatchewan Volunteer Medal

Volunteer medal
Provincial and territorial orders of Canada